"Until the Pain is Gone" is a single by British singer-songwriter  Daley. The song was released through BMG Rights Management, on 24 March 2017, and premiered by Billboard. The song features guest vocals from Jill Scott. Produced by Hitesh Ceon and co-produced by Andre "Dre" Harris.

Critical reception
Beatrice Hazlehurst of Paper wrote: "Just when you thought RnB music was destined to become more genre multi-hyphenate than the syncopated soul we all fell in love with, in comes Daley. While Daley's expert simulation of OG RnB may come as a surprise given the fact Daley is red-haired British boy, but his latest offering, "Until the Pain is Gone", proves he deserves to be in the same arena as the greats."

Music video
The music video was premiered on 31 March 2017, and is directed by Julian Schratter.

Personnel 
 Daley – vocals, composition
 Jill Scott – vocals
 Hitesh Ceon – production, composition, instruments
 Andre Harris – co-production, instruments
 Francis Murray – recording

Charts

Weekly charts

Year-end charts

References

2017 singles
2017 songs
Songs written by Hitesh Ceon
Jill Scott (singer) songs
Daley (musician) songs